William Campion may refer to:
William Campion (governor), British MP for Lewes and governor of Western Australia
William Campion (died 1615) (1549–1615), MP for Haslemere
William Campion (mathematician) (1820–1896), mathematician and president of Queens' College, Cambridge
William Campion (Jesuit) (1599–1665), English Jesuit
William Campion (organist), organist of Chichester Cathedral
William Campion (1640–1702), MP for Kent
Bill Campion (born 1952), American basketball player